Gerry Mullins (born 29 December 1953) is an Irish equestrian. He competed at the 1984 Summer Olympics and the 1988 Summer Olympics.

References

External links
 

1953 births
Living people
Irish male equestrians
Olympic equestrians of Ireland
Equestrians at the 1984 Summer Olympics
Equestrians at the 1988 Summer Olympics
Place of birth missing (living people)